Tolpia kalimantania is a moth of the family Erebidae first described by Michael Fibiger in 2011. It is found on Borneo (it was described from Kalimantan).

The wingspan is about 13 mm. The forewings are relatively long and broad and the ground colour is dark brown with black-brown patches at the base. The antemedial and postmedial lines are well marked and black. The terminal line is indicated by black interveinal dots. The hindwing ground colour is brown and the abdomen and hindleg have long, dark-brown scent scales.

References

Micronoctuini
Taxa named by Michael Fibiger
Moths described in 2011